Richard Barber (born 1941) is a British historian.

Richard Barber may also refer to:

Richard Trevor Barber (1925–2015), New Zealand cricketer
Richard Barber (MP), Member of Parliament (MP) for Great Grimsby
Richard Barber (priest), English priest
Dick Barber (1910–1983), American long jumper
Richard Barber (politician), see Ottawa City Council